Eria is a genus of orchids with more than 50 species distributed in China, the Himalayas, the Indian Subcontinent, Southeast Asia, New Guinea, Polynesia, Melanesia and Micronesia.

Species 
Eria species accepted by the Plants of the World Online as of February 2021:

Eria albescens 
Eria aurantiaca 
Eria bancana 
Eria berringtoniana 
Eria bifalcis 
Eria bigibba 
Eria binabayensis 
Eria carolettae 
Eria chlorantha 
Eria clausa 
Eria compressoclavata 
Eria convallariopsis 
Eria coronaria 
Eria curtisii 
Eria dayana 
Eria decipiens 
Eria floribunda 
Eria gagnepainii 
Eria geboana 
Eria genuflexa 
Eria halconensis 
Eria imbricata 
Eria imitans 
Eria imperatifolia 
Eria javanica 
Eria kaniensis 
Eria lactiflora 
Eria micholitziana 
Eria nepalensis 
Eria oblonga 
Eria odorifera 
Eria pachycephala 
Eria peraffinis 
Eria puberula 
Eria ramosii 
Eria ramuana 
Eria rhomboidalis 
Eria rostriflora 
Eria sabasaroe 
Eria sarcophylla 
Eria sarrasinorum 
Eria scabrilinguis 
Eria sessilifolia 
Eria stenobulba 
Eria straminea 
Eria tomohonensis 
Eria umbonata 
Eria villosissima 
Eria viridibracteata 
Eria vittata 
Eria wenzelii 
Eria yanshanensis

Formerly placed here 
Many former Eria species have been recategorized in other genera (e.g. Bryobium, Cylindrolobus, Cryptochilus, Dendrolirium, Mycaranthes, Pinalia, Plocoglottis):
Eria acervata, now known as Pinalia acervata
Eria acuminata, now known as Aeridostachya acuminata
Eria amica, now known as Pinalia amica
Eria anceps, now known as Mycaranthes anceps
Eria bambusifolia, now known as Bambuseria bambusifolia
Eria bipunctata, now known as Pinalia bipunctata
Eria candoonensis, now known as Mycaranthes candoonensis
Eria carinata, now known as Cryptochilus acuminatus
Eria clemensiae, now known as Mycaranthes clemensiae
Eria cymbidifolia, now known as Ascidieria cymbidifolia
Eria cyrtosepala, now known as Callostylis cyrtosepala
Eria davaensis, now known as Mycaranthes davaensis
Eria dischorensis, now known as Bryobium dischorense
Eria discolor, now included in Callostylis rigida
Eria eriaeoides, now known as Bryobium eriaeoides
Eria excavata, now known as Pinalia excavata
Eria ferruginea Lindl., now known as Dendrolirium ferrugineum
Eria ferruginea Teijsm. & Binn., now known as Aeridostachya robusta
Eria fitzalanii, now known as Pinalia fitzalanii
Eria gigantea, now known as Mycaranthes gigantea
Eria globifera, now known as Campanulorchis globifera
Eria graminifolia, now known as Pinalia graminifolia
Eria irukandjiana, now known as Bryobium irukandjianum
Eria kingii F.Muell., now known as Pinalia moluccana
Eria kingii Hook.f., now known as Mycaranthes oblitterata
Eria lamellata, now known as Mycaranthes lamellata
Eria lasiopetala, now known as Dendrolirium lasiopetalum
Eria leiophylla, now known as Campanulorchis leiophylla
Eria longibracteata, now known as Mycaranthes longibracteata
Eria longifolia, now known as Ascidieria longifolia
Eria mindanaensis, now known as Mycaranthes mindanaensis
Eria monophylla, now included in Bryobium pudicum
Eria ornata, now known as Dendrolirium ornatum
Eria palawanensis, now known as Ascidieria palawanensis
Eria pellipes, now known as Campanulorchis pellipes
Eria pholidotoides, is now included in Callostylis rigida 
Eria pulchella, now known as Callostylis pulchella
Eria queenslandica, now known as Bryobium queenslandicum
Eria scortechinii, now known as Dilochiopsis scortechinii
Eria stricta, now known as Pinalia stricta
Eria vanoverberghii, now known as Mycaranthes vanoverberghii 
Eria zamboangensis, now known as Ascidieria zamboangensis

References

External links 

 
Podochileae genera